Rajendra K. Srivastava is Novartis Professor of Marketing Strategy and Innovation at the Indian School of Business. He has been a tenured professor and an academic administrator and has worked in the United States, Singapore, and India.
He has been listed in the Forbes's Tycoons of Tomorrow 2018. He is also a member of the board of directors of Happiest Minds, a publicly listed company in India.

Early life and education 
Born in Lucknow, India, Rajendra Srivastava did his schooling at the La Martiniere College. He holds a B.Tech. (Honors) in Mechanical Engineering from Indian Institute of Technology (IIT), Kanpur, MS (Industrial Engineering) from the University of Rhode Island, and MBA and Ph.D. in business from the University of Pittsburgh.

Education:
1979	Ph.D. (Business Administration), University of Pittsburgh
1978	MBA, University of Pittsburgh
1974	MS (Industrial Engineering), University of Rhode Island
1972	B.Tech. (Mechanical Engineering), Indian Institute of Technology, Kanpur

Academic career 

Srivastava has served as Provost and Deputy President at Singapore Management University. He also served as a Senior Associate Dean at the McCombs Business School, the University of Texas at Austin and at the Goizueta Business School at Emory University. He held the George Kozmetsky Centennial Chair at UT-Austin and the Roberto C. Goizueta Chair in Marketing and Digital Commerce at Emory University. Srivastava serves as a Research Fellow at the Institute for Studies in Business Markets (ISBM), Smeal College of Business, Penn State University and at IC-Sq. Institute, the University of Texas at Austin. He is also a Mack Institute Senior Fellow, Wharton School, University of Pennsylvania. He has been a Visiting Professor at London Business School, Indian School of Business and Helsinki School of Economics.
He led innovation-driven and research-informed changes in academic programs. He is a strong advocate for a balance between theory and practice as well as for relevant research that informs and influences both management practices and public policy.

Professional activities and research 

Srivastava is committed to cross-functional integration in the management of business processes. He has championed inter-disciplinary research and academic programs and has nurtured multi-disciplinary areas of excellence in financial markets, innovation, and business analytics at SMU. This interest is also reflected in his work related to technology commercialization at ATI and IC2 Institute at UT Austin.

A highly cited scholar, his research, spanning marketing and finance/economics, has been published in Journal of Marketing, Journal of Marketing Research, Marketing Science and Journal of Banking and Finance. He was a guest editor for the Journal of Marketing Research's Special Issue on Brand Management and Equity, and the Journal of Marketing Special Issues on Marketing Strategy Meets Wall Street (2009 and 2016 [in process]). Additionally, he has served on the editorial boards of several academic journals including Journal of Marketing Research (JMR) and International Journal for Research in Marketing (IJRM).

Srivastava's research interests include Marketing Strategy, Marketing Metrics, and Brand/Customer Management. His current work focuses on Business Model Innovations, especially in Services, B2B, Technology and Emerging Markets. His current teaching interests include Business Model Innovation, Strategic Performance Management, Marketing Accountability and Driving Growth and Shareholder Value. He is best known for his work on measuring the impact of market-facing business processes (innovation, supply-chain and customer management) that create value for customers, and the value of market-based assets (customers, channels, brands and value networks). He is also well known for his work in competitive market structures and brand equity/strategic brand management.

Awards and accolades 

Srivastava was inducted as an AMA Fellow by the American Marketing Association in 2020. He is the recipient of the 2004 AMA Marketing Strategy SIG Mahajan Award for Career Contributions to Marketing Strategy. He also received the 1985 Alpha Kappa Psi Award from the American Marketing Association for the article in the Journal of Marketing judged to contribute most to the practice of marketing. In 1993 and 2002 he received the highest recognition for research at The University of Texas – the CBA Foundation Awards for Outstanding Research Contributions and Excellence. His paper on Market-Based Assets in the Journal of Marketing received both the 1998 Maynard Award for the article judged to contribute most to the development of theory in marketing and the MSI/Paul Root Award for the article judged to contribute most to the practice of marketing, the only time a single paper has won both awards. This same paper went on to win the AMA/Sheth Foundation Award for Long-Term contributions to the discipline of marketing. He is also a recipient of the Marketing Science Institute's Research Awards on Brand Equity and on Assessment of the Value of Information Technology.

 2010	Sheth Foundation Best Paper Award for Journal of the Academy of Marketing Science (Volume 37, 2009) (May 2010)
 2009	Lifetime Achievement Award, Academy of Marketing, Brand SIG (April 2010)
 2007	Award for Most Relevant (Bridging Theory and Practice) Executive MBA Course, Modular EMBA program, Emory University
 2007	Sheth Foundation Award for the article written in Journal of Marketing during the previous five to ten years that is judged to contribute most to the marketing discipline (February)
 2005	Nominated for Educator of the Year Award, Academy of Marketing Science
 2004	AMA Marketing Strategy SIG Mahajan Award for Career Contributions to Strategy
 2002	Chair for The Outstanding Submission for the 2002 ISBM Business Marketing Doctoral Support Award Competition (Maria Merino's Dissertation on Impact of Marketing on Corporate Risk)
 2002 University of Texas CBA Foundation Award for Research Excellence (for Contributions to Research on Marketing-Finance Interface)
 2002	Nominated for Teaching Excellence in Executive Programs, University of Texas
 1999	Maynard Award by the American Marketing Association for 1998 Journal of Marketing article judged to contribute most to the development of theory in marketing
 1999	Marketing Science Institute/Paul Root Award by the American Marketing Association for 1998 Journal of Marketing article judged to contribute most to the practice of marketing
 1999	MSI Best Paper Award for all manuscripts published during 1997 in the MSI Working Paper Series. Trustees of the MSI member companies confer this award.
 1995	co-chair for Best University-Wide Doctoral Dissertation at The University of Texas (Thesis – Goutam Challagalla; Co-chair – Dr. Tassu Shervani)
 1993 University of Texas CBA Foundation Award for Outstanding (Lifetime) Research Contributions
 1993	Nominated for the Joe D. Beasley Award (MBA Marketing Management Core Course)
 1992	Nominated for University Graduate Teaching Excellence Award by the Marketing Department
 1991 	Honorable Mention, Marketing Science Institute Research Competition on Managing Information to Improve Competitiveness (with Elliot Maltz)
 1991	Nominated for University Graduate Teaching Excellence Award by the Marketing Department
 1989	First Prize, Marketing Science Institute Research Competition on Brand Equity
 1989	Nominated for College of Business Research Excellence Award by the Marketing Department
 1985	Alpha Kappa Psi Award, by the American Marketing Association for 1984 Journal of Marketing article judged to contribute most to the practice of marketing
 1985	Nominated for University Graduate Teaching Excellence Award by the Marketing Department
 1985	Cited as among the top 20 contributors to Marketing Journals (Journal of Marketing Education)
 1985	Nominated for College of Business Research Excellence Award by the Marketing Department
 1984	Cited as among the top 20 contributors to the Association for Consumer Research Conferences
 1972	Merit Award, Association of Mechanical Engineers (India)
 1967–72 Merit Scholarship/Fellowship – Indian Institute of Technology, Kanpur
 1967	National Science Talent Search Scholarship (India)

Teaching awards and recognitions 

 Nominated (by SMU Students) for the Best MBA Elective Professor - Brand Management (2009)
 Executive-MBA Award for Most Relevant Seminar - Strategic Performance Management (2007)
 Co-chair for Best University-Wide Doctoral Dissertation at The University of Texas (Thesis—Goutam Challagalla; Co-chair—Dr. Tassu Shervani)
 Organized a team of students (BBA, MBA, and Advertising candidates) to enter the 1982 General Motors Intercollegiate Competition. The project required the development of a Marketing/Advertising campaign for the Oldsmobile Cutlass Diesel automobile. The University of Texas team placed second, nationwide. Professor Robert P. Leone was co-coordinator.
 Nominated the Joe D. Beasley Award (MBA Marketing Management Core Course) (1993 and 1994)
 Nominated by Marketing Department for University Level Graduate Teaching Award (for contributions to PhD Education) (1984, 1991 & 1992)
 Nominated by MBA students for "Outstanding (MBA) Core Professor," (Spring 1984, Spring 1987, Spring 1988).
 Teaching Excellence in Executive Programs (Runner-Up), UT-Austin (2002)

References 

 Harold H. Maynard Award Previous Winners, AMA
 MSI/H. Paul Root Award Previous Winners, AMA
 Sheth Foundation/Journal of Marketing Award Previous Winners, AMA
 Vijay Mahajan Award Previous Winners, AMA
 Subscription as a service: The Netflix playbook] (6 January 2020) Fortune India
 Business School Deans Live the Crisis, Not Just Teach About It (16 June 2020) Bloomberg Businessweek
 With unpredictability comes flexibility: ISB Dean (24 June 2020) Hindu Business Line
 B-schools face a moment of reckoning (July 8, 2020) Live Mint
 B-schools should flourish under India's revised education policy (24 September 2020) Live Mint
 Short term post-experience management courses enhance peer-to-peer learning (4 February 2019) Times of India.
 India's ISB keen to partner with Bangladesh institutions (18 April 2019) The Independent
 https://economictimes.indiatimes.com/industry/services/education/why-india-lags-as-a-study-destination/articleshow/70504221.cms Why India lags as a study destination] (3 August 2019) Economic Times
 Bitner, Mahajan, and Srivastava Named Newest AMA Fellows] (12 December 2019) AMA
 Trends That Will Shape Business Education In 2018, According To Top Deans Business Because (15 January 2018)
 Most MBAs know the theory but can't convert ideas into actions: Rajendra Srivastava] Forbes India (18 January 2018)
 ISB May Be The Most Interesting B-School In The World Poet & Quants (26 November 2018)
 Setting the table by reharmonizing innovation, industrial and competition policy in India (23 February 2018) Live Mint
 Blending Theory with Practice Business world (25 November 2017)

External links 
 ISB Professor, Indian School of Business
 Blending Theory With Practice

La Martinière College, Lucknow alumni
American people of Indian descent
American businesspeople
Indian emigrants to the United States
Living people
IIT Kanpur alumni
University of Rhode Island alumni
Indian business speakers
Marketing people
Marketing theorists
Emory University faculty
1951 births